The Ultimate Collection is a 2002 two-disc greatest hits set by the Who with both singles and top hits from albums, all of which have been remastered. The compilation was released by Polydor Records internationally and on MCA Records in the U.S. The first 150,000 copies added a third disk with rare tracks and music videos. The album debuted on the Billboard 200 album chart on 29 June 2002, at No. 31 and hit No. 17 on the British charts. It was certified gold by the RIAA on 15 July 2002 and platinum on 13 March 2008.

Track listing
All songs written by Pete Townshend except where noted.

British edition

Disc one

Disc two

American edition

Disc one

Disc two

Disc three (Limited edition only)

Personnel
The Who
Roger Daltrey – lead vocals
John Entwistle – bass guitar, horn, lead vocals on "Boris the Spider", "My Wife" and "The Quiet One", backing vocals
Pete Townshend – guitar, vocals, synthesizer, keyboards
Keith Moon – drums, percussion (UK: disc 1 & disc 2 tracks 1-11/US: disc 1 & disc 2 tracks 1-12), backing vocals on "Pictures of Lily"
Kenney Jones – drums (UK: disc 2 tracks 12-17/US: disc 2 tracks 13 & 14)

Additional musicians
The Ivy League - backing vocals on "I Can't Explain"
Jimmy Page - rhythm guitar on "I Can't Explain"
Nicky Hopkins - piano on "Let's See Action" and "Long Live Rock"
Dave Arbus – violin on "Baba O'Riley"
Rod Argent – piano on "Who Are You"
Andy Fairweather Low – backing vocals on "Who Are You"
Chris Stainton – piano on "5:15"

Production
Jon Astley – mastering
Glyn Johns – associate production on "Behind Blue Eyes," "Won't Get Fooled Again" and "Baba O'Riley", production on "Squeeze Box", "Who Are You", "Athena" and "Eminence Front"
Matt Kent – liner notes
Kit Lambert – production on "I'm a Boy", "Happy Jack", "I Can See for Miles", "Magic Bus", and "See Me Feel Me"
Shel Talmy – production on "I Can't Explain", "My Generation", and "The Kids Are Alright"
Bill Szymczyk – production on "You Better You Bet", "Don't Let Go The Coat", "The Quiet One" and "Another Tricky Day"
The Who – production on "Summertime Blues", "Behind Blue Eyes", "Won't Get Fooled Again", "5:15", and "Love Reign o'er Me"
 Design & Art Direction by Richard Evans

Chart performance

Certifications

References

2002 greatest hits albums
The Who compilation albums
MCA Records compilation albums
Polydor Records compilation albums
Geffen Records compilation albums